Great Northern Brewing Company was a traditional “gravity flow” brewery located in the northernmost block of downtown Whitefish, Montana. The brewery opened in 1995 under the stewardship of Minott Wessinger, the great-great grandson of Henry Weinhard.
The brewery permanently closed February 17, 2020

History 
The Great Northern Brewing Company was built by renowned architect Joe Esherick in 1994. The brewery was built over six months, from June to December in 1994 and officially opened its doors in January 1995.
Minott Wessinger, great-great-grandson of Henry Weinhard, founder of Blitz-Weinhard Brewing of Portland, Oregon, started GNBC. Built with a strong family tradition of brewing, the brewery features a three-story brewhouse tower, housing the brewing vessels and copper kettle to allow for a traditional “gravity flow” process.

After seven years of brewing Black Star, Wessinger decided to stop brewing at GNBC in order to pursue other projects.  In 2002, the brewery was placed under the ownership and management of Dennis Konopatzke and GNBC continued to produce their other beers.

On February 6, 2010, fifteen years after the Great Northern Brewing Company was first built, Minott Wessinger and GNBC began to produce Black Star beer again.  Subsequently, Great Northern has again ceased brewing Black Star.

Rob Isackson, a real estate developer with California-based Village Investment Partners who has owned a home in Whitefish for two decades, confirmed that his firm acquired the Black Star building, and Great Northern Brewing Company closed February 17, 2020.

The Brewery 
The average batch size for GNBC is 20 beer barrels (620 gallons).  It takes six to eight hours to produce each batch.  The brewery produces 160 barrels per week, approximately 8000 barrels per year.

The Draught House 
(Formerly known as a Tasting Room) Recategorized as an on-premises retailer in January, 2009 the Draught House replaced what was formerly the brewery's Tasting Room.  The Draught House (pronounced draft) is located within the Great Northern Brewery facility. The Draught House exclusively serves Great Northern beers and a variety of northwestern wines. The Draught House is open daily, year round.

References 

https://flatheadbeacon.com/2020/01/27/draught-house-doors-close-great-northern-brewing-contemplates-future/

External links

Beer brewing companies based in Montana
Commercial buildings completed in 1994
Whitefish, Montana
Buildings and structures in Flathead County, Montana